William Roberts (born 4 June 1998) is a British and Welsh track cyclist, who currently rides for UCI Continental team . He has represented Wales at the Commonwealth Games and won a bronze medal.

Cycling career
Roberts was part of the Wales Racing Academy when he became a British champion, after winning the team pursuit event at the 2022 British National Track Championships.

In 2022, he was selected for the 2022 Commonwealth Games in Birmingham where he competed in the men's scratch race and won a bronze medal. His success during 2022 continued as he won a silver medal in the inaugural Elimination race at the 2022 National Championships.

Roberts won his third second title at the 2023 British Cycling National Track Championships, he won the team pursuit for the second time.

References

1998 births
Living people
British male cyclists
British track cyclists
Welsh track cyclists
Welsh male cyclists
Cyclists at the 2022 Commonwealth Games
Commonwealth Games competitors for Wales
Commonwealth Games medallists in cycling
Commonwealth Games bronze medallists for Wales
Medallists at the 2022 Commonwealth Games